Robin Page (born May 1943) is an English farmer, conservationist and political activist, who has worked as a journalist and television presenter.

Page farms in Barton, Cambridgeshire where he was born, and his work focuses on rural affairs.

Countryside Restoration Trust
Page founded the CRT in 1993 with the late artist and conservationist, Gordon Beningfield. It promotes a "living" countryside including wildlife-friendly farming. By 2021, when Page's Executive Chairmanship of the CRT ended, it had developed into a nationwide chain of 18 small farms involved with principles of  conservation of land, wildlife and farming.
As at 2021 Page continues to serve as a trustee.

Recent projects involving the CRT include an attempt in 2020 to buy a farm in the Lake District. This would have been a community-based project involving the Friends of the Lake District and the author and farmer James Rebanks.

Media work

Print
Page is the author of numerous books, such as The Wildlife of the Royal Estates, 1984 (foreword by the Duke of Edinburgh) and The Hunting Gene, 2000 (foreword by Robin Hanbury-Tenison). These are mainly published by Bird's Farm Books based in Barton. Until 2016 he wrote a long-running column for the Daily Telegraph.

His views about conservation are sometimes controversial, for example his call for blanket protection to be removed from birds of prey, on the premise that their population is unnaturally high, causing excessive destruction of many songbirds and other prey. According to BBC wildlife presenter Chris Packham, a 2015 article by Page about raptors was "an idiotic, ill informed rant" by someone with "no qualified understanding of even basic ecology".

TV
In the 1990s he presented One Man and His Dog, a television show featuring sheepdog trials.

Political career
Page was elected to South Cambridgeshire District Council as an independent in 1972, holding his seat until he resigned in 2006.

He stood as the Conservative Party candidate in Bethnal Green and Bow at the 1979 general election, finishing in third place.
He stood as a Eurosceptic, campaigning for Britain to leave the EU, in South Cambridgeshire for the Referendum Party in the 1997 general election, then joined the UK Independence Party (UKIP), standing in the Winchester by-election later the same year, and again in South Cambridgeshire at the 2005 general election.

Page resigned from UKIP after not being selected as a party candidate for the East of England constituency at the 2009 European Elections, Page claimed that the party's MEPs were part of a "gravy train", and that leader Nigel Farage dominated the party excessively.  He joined the UK First Party, and was the lead candidate on their list in the East of England.
The UK First Party disbanded in 2010 and in the 2010 United Kingdom general election he stood for a third time in South Cambridgeshire, as an independent.

Allegations of racism
In 2002, Page was arrested, based upon false allegations of inciting racial hatred in a speech he gave at a fair in Gloucestershire, but was later released as police were of the opinion that no crime had been committed. Page claimed that he was framed by Gloucestershire Police.
In 2008 Gloucestershire Police made a four-figure payment to Page for his wrongful arrest, conceding and compensating him for his complaint.

In 2016 Page again attracted controversy by making remarks (which he dismissed as a joke) about deceiving immigrants into taking contraceptive drugs.

Elections contested

References

1943 births
Living people
English farmers
English television presenters
English male journalists
Independent politicians in England
People from South Cambridgeshire District
Referendum Party politicians
UK Independence Party parliamentary candidates
Conservative Party (UK) parliamentary candidates
Councillors in Cambridgeshire
Independent councillors in the United Kingdom